The men's light welterweight (63 kg/138.6 lbs) Low-Kick division at the W.A.K.O. European Championships 2006 in Skopje was the fifth lightest of the male Low-Kick tournaments and was one of the largest involving seventeen fighters.  Each of the matches was three rounds of two minutes each and were fought under Low-Kick kickboxing rules.

As there were not enough fighters for a sixteen man competition, one of the men received a bye into the quarter finals.  The gold medal was won by Russian Artur Magadov who defeated Denmark's Ayoub Saidi in the final by unanimous decision.  Gleb Bozko and Akaev Kurbanali, from Estonia and Russia, received bronze medals.

Results

Key

See also
List of WAKO Amateur European Championships
List of WAKO Amateur World Championships
List of male kickboxers

References

External links
 WAKO World Association of Kickboxing Organizations Official Site

W.A.K.O. European Championships 2006 (Skopje)